The 2021 Campeonato Paranaense (officially the Campeonato Paranaense de Futebol Profissional da 1ª Divisão - Temporada 2021) was the 107th edition of the top division of football in the state of Paraná organized by FPF. The competition started on 27 February and ended on 13 October.

FPF suspended the second and third rounds scheduled for the first two weeks of March due to the COVID-19 pandemic in Brazil. The tournament resumed on 11 March. Athletico Paranaense were the defending champions but were eliminated in the semi-finals.

On 14 March, FC Cascavel fielded, against Paraná, the goalkeeper João Pedro. As João Pedro had not a professional contract, he was an ineligible player. Due to this, FC Cascavel were deducted six points and sanctioned with a fine of R$1,000 after they were punished, on 26 April, by Tribunal de Justiça Desportiva do Paraná (TJD–PR).

On 22 April four players of Cascavel CR were stopped from playing against Athletico Paranaense because of suspicions they had attempted to falsify their COVID-19 tests. FPF started an investigation after a laboratory reported that the players had not taken their COVID-19 tests on the due dates. Originally, on 5 May, Cascavel CR were suspended for 180 days and sanctioned with a fine of R$20,000, however, after an appeal, TJD–PR increased the suspension to 720 days and the fine to R$200,000. Despite their suspension, Cascavel CR was cleared by Supremo Tribunal de Justiça Desportiva to play the last round of the first stage against Maringá.

Tied 2–2 on aggregate, Londrina won their 5th title after defeating FC Cascavel on penalties.

Format
In the first stage, each team played the other eleven teams in a single round-robin tournament. The teams were ranked according to points. If tied on points, the following criteria would be used to determine the ranking: 1. Wins; 2. Goal difference; 3. Goals scored; 4. Head-to-head results (only between two teams); 5. Fewest red cards; 6. Fewest yellow cards; 7. Draw in the headquarters of the FPF.

Top eight teams advanced to the quarter-finals of the final stages. The bottom two teams were relegated to the second division. Top three teams not already qualified for 2022 Série A, Série B or Série C qualified for 2022 Série D.

Final stage was played on a home-and-away two-legged basis, with the best overall performance team hosting the second leg. If tied on aggregate, the penalty shoot-out would be used to determine the winners. Top four teams qualified for the 2022 Copa do Brasil.

Participating teams

First stage

Final stage

Bracket

Quarter-finals

|}

Group A

Operário Ferroviário qualified for the semi-finals.

Group B

FC Cascavel qualified for the semi-finals.

Group C

Athletico Paranaense qualified for the semi-finals.

Group D

Londrina qualified for the semi-finals.

Semi-finals

|}

Group E

Londrina qualified for the finals.

Group F

FC Cascavel qualified for the semi-finals.

Finals

|}

Group G

Overall table

Top goalscorers

References

Paranaense
Campeonato Paranaense